This is a list of missions supporting heliophysics, including solar observatory missions, solar orbiters, and spacecraft studying the solar wind. Status as of 01/03/2023.

Graphic

See also
List of solar telescopes

References

External links
 NASA - Heliophysics missions

Astronomy-related lists
Physics-related lists
Sun
Space science
Solar System
NASA space probes